Luis Alberto Spinetta (23 January 1950 – 8 February 2012), nicknamed "El Flaco" (Spanish for "skinny"), was an Argentine singer, guitarist, composer and poet. One of the most influential rock musicians of Argentina, he is regarded as one of the founders of Argentine rock, considered the first incarnation of Spanish-language rock. Born in Buenos Aires in the residential neighbourhood of Belgrano, he was the founder of iconic rock bands including Almendra, Pescado Rabioso, Invisible, Spinetta Jade, and Spinetta y Los Socios del Desierto. In Argentina January 23rd is celebrated as "Día Nacional del Músico" (National Musician's Day) in honor of Spinetta's birth

Spinetta devoted himself fully to his own music. In his lyrics, there are influences of multiple writers, poets and artists like Arthur Rimbaud, Vincent van Gogh, Carl Jung, Sigmund Freud, Friedrich Nietzsche, Michel Foucault, Gilles Deleuze, Carlos Castañeda and Antonin Artaud, who has his name in the album Artaud.

In December 2011 he announced that he had been diagnosed with lung cancer. He died on 8 February 2012 at the age of 62. His ashes were scattered in Buenos Aires in the waters of the Río de la Plata, according to his last wish.

Music

The late 1960s and the 1970s

In the late 1960s, against the backdrop of the reactionary and authoritarian government of General Juan Carlos Onganía, Buenos Aires was undergoing a cultural blossoming of new artistic expressions; the new generation of the middle class was immersed in an effervescence that would not reappear in Argentina until the return to democracy in 1983.

In 1969, Spinetta's band, Almendra, recorded their self-titled first album. They started recording and playing intensively and they became successful almost overnight. Almendra composed their own songs and their lyrics were written in Spanish, something which was still new for Argentine rock music. After two albums that were received with critical acclaim and continuous radio diffusion, the band split.

After a lengthy stay in Europe, Spinetta returned to Argentina and afterwards formed a new band: Pescado Rabioso. With a far more powerful sound and expressing through their songs and lyrics the tension of the streets in an increasingly violent Argentina, Pescado made their album debut in 1972. It was both a continuation of the creative stream of Spinetta and a drastic change in the style of his own music and lyrics. Later, the band recorded a second album. Although a third album, released in 1973 and called Artaud carried the band's name, the band had actually already dissolved. Therefore, it was mostly a solo album by Spinetta himself. Partly inspired by the writings of Theatre of Cruelty creator Antonin Artaud, particularly his essays Van Gogh, le suicidé de la société ("Van Gogh, the suicide by society") and Héliogabale ou l'Anarchiste couronné ("Heliogabalus, or the anarchist crowned"), Spinetta exorcised many of the demons of his past in this album. He simultaneously released a manifesto entitled Rock: música dura, la suicidada por la sociedad ("Rock: tough music, suicided by society"), a reference to Artaud's essay, in which he denounced the nihilistic hedonism and commercialisation he saw as having corrupted rock music.
This process would open the door to a new era in his music.

In 1974 he formed a new band, Invisible, heavy on hard or prog rock and psychodelia. With his new band he recorded three albums: Invisible, Durazno Sangrando and El jardín de los presentes. In the last album, the new tunes were more harmonic and reached heights of delicacy and musicianship, mellowing the trademark power of the band.

After recording and editing a failed album in the United States in 1979, with lyrics in English and destined to the U.S. market, Spinetta returned to Argentina to record two albums with a short-lived Almendra Revival (one with original songs and the other live), and embarked on a new project: Spinetta Jade.

The 1980s and beyond

Spinetta Jade would prove to be a successful and innovative band; Spinetta was joined by some of the most acclaimed Argentine musicians to help him build the new sound he was building since Invisible. The product: a blend of jazz and rock that was unseen in Argentina drawing away from the symphonic rock that dominated the middle 70s, and escaping the boom of new wave, punk, reggae, glam pop etc that reached both the world and Argentina in the 1980s. These four albums, Alma de Diamante (1980), Los Niños que Escriben en el Cielo (1981), Bajo Belgrano (1983) and Madre en Años Luz (1984), represent a defined style as well as the footprints of Spinetta's evolution. Spinetta and Charly García (with their respective bands at the moment, Jade and Serú Giran) joined efforts and gave what was considered amongst the most important shows in the history of Argentine rock. After dissolving Spinetta Jade in 1984, Spinetta worked on an album with Charly, but eventually they abandoned their efforts. Only two songs remain of the ill-fated effort, "Rezo por Vos" and "Total Interferencia".

By 1982, Spinetta had restarted his solo projects, and from then on would never leave them. Kamikaze (1982) puts together a number of previously unreleased songs (one gem is an early song he composed in 1965 called "Barro Tal Vez"). In Mondo Di Cromo (1983) Spinetta's new production, from 1986 to 1993, would include four solo albums (Privé, 1986), Téster de Violencia (1988), Don Lucero (1989), Pelusón of Milk (1991), a joint album with Fito Páez, another Argentine great (La La La, 1986), and the soundtrack of the movie Fuego Gris (named after the film, 1993).

After a long hiatus, largely due to Spinetta's conflicts with recording companies, he finally opened a new period in his music with his new band: Spinetta y los Socios del Desierto. Over three years (1997–1999) the band released four albums. Two studio albums, the double Socios del Desierto (1997) and Los Ojos (1999) would bring a new sound. The band made an MTV Unplugged live album, Estrelicia (1998), which, because of its soft acoustics, contrasts with their live album, San Cristóforo (1998). As Spinetta said at the beginning of the first concert, "Fans de lo acústico, abstenerse" ("Fans of acoustic music, refrain"). In 1998, he selected the featured songs and artwork of a greatest hits album called Elija y Gane, which was edited the same year. 

The band dissolved quietly towards the end of 1999. Spinetta started a solo career, including Silver Sorgo (2001), Obras en Vivo (2002), a live album, Para Los Árboles (2003), Camalotus (2004), a single of three unreleased songs and one remix, Pan (2006) and Un Mañana (2008). In 2005, he received the Platinum Konex Award for best rock soloist of the 1995–2005 decade. A number of books and TV documentaries have been devoted to him. Argentine writer Eduardo Berti published a book about Spinetta, which includes a long conversation with Spinetta.

In 2009 Spinetta celebrated his 40 years in music with a five-and-a-half-hours concert called "Spinetta y las Bandas Eternas" (Spinetta and The Eternal Bands) in front of 40 thousand fans at Vélez Sarsfield Stadium in Buenos Aires. It was later considered by Argentine music critics as "the greatest gig of the decade".

Death
Spinetta died of lung cancer at 62 years of age on 8 February 2012.

Family
Spinetta had four children: Dante (born 1976), Catarina (b. 1979), Valentino (b. 1983) and Vera (b. 1991).

Tribute
On 23 January 2020, Google celebrated his 70th birthday with a Google Doodle.

Discography

Almendra
Studio albums
 Almendra (1969)
 Almendra II (1970)
 El Valle Interior (1980)
Live albums
 Almendra en Obras I/II (1980)

Pescado Rabioso
 Desatormentándonos (1972)
 Pescado 2 (1973)
 Artaud (1973)

Invisible
Studio albums
 Invisible (1974)
 Durazno Sangrando (1975)
 El jardín de los presentes (1976)
Non-album singles

 "Estado de coma" (1974)

"La llave del Mandala" (1974)
 "Viejos ratones del tiempo" (1974)

Live albums

 En Vivo Teatro Coliseo 1975 (2022)

Spinetta Jade
 Alma de Diamante (1980)
 Los Niños Que Escriben En El Cielo (1981)
 Bajo Belgrano (1983)
 Madre en Años Luz (1984)

Spinetta y los Socios del Desierto
Studio albums
 Socios del Desierto (1996)
 Los Ojos (1999)
Live albums

 San Cristóforo (1998)

Solo
Studio albums
 Spinettalandia y Sus Amigos - La Búsqueda de la Estrella (1971)
 Artaud (1973, edited as an album of Pescado Rabioso)
 A 18´ del Sol (1977)
 Only Love Can Sustain (1980) (Solo el Amor Puede Sostener)
 Kamikaze (1982)
 Mondo Di Cromo (1982)
 Privé (1986)
 La La La (1986, con Fito Páez)
 Téster de Violencia (1988)
 Don Lucero (1989)
 Pelusón of Milk (1991)
 Fuego Gris (1993, soundtrack)
 Silver Sorgo (2001)
 Para los Árboles (2003)
 Camalotus (2004)
 Pan (2006)
 Un Mañana (2008)
 Los Amigo (2015, posthumous)
Live albums

 Exactas (1990, live)
 Estrelicia (1997, MTV Unplugged)
 San Cristóforo: Un Sauna de Lava Eléctrico (1998, live)
 Argentina Sorgo Films Presenta: Spinetta Obras (2002, live)
 Spinetta y las Bandas Eternas (2010, live)
 Presentación ARTAUD - 1973 - Teatro Astral (2020, official bootleg)
 Presentación ARTAUD - 1973 - Teatro Astral Vol. 2 (2021, official bootleg)

Compilations

 Elija y Gane (1999, greatest hits)
 Ya no mires atrás (2020, unreleased material) (recorded 2008-09)

Poetry
 1978: Guitarra negra (English: "Black Guitar"). Buenos Aires: Ediciones Tres Tiempos.

References

Further reading

External links

Official Page (Spanish)
Biography at Rock.com.ar (Spanish)

1950 births
2012 deaths
Argentine male guitarists
20th-century Argentine male singers
Argentine male singer-songwriters
Argentine multi-instrumentalists
21st-century Argentine male singers
Deaths from cancer in Argentina
Deaths from lung cancer
Musicians from Buenos Aires
Rock en Español musicians
Latin music songwriters
Rock songwriters